Temet is the second studio album by Tuareg band Imarhan, released on the German City Slang label in 2018.

A reviewer for the Financial Times wrote that the album was full of "fiery, bluesy political tunes". The album was recorded in Paris.

Tracklist

References

2018 albums